Namo Bhootatma is a 2014 Kannada horror comedy film directed by Murali in his debut. The film was a remake of the 2014 Tamil film Yaamirukka Bayamey, which itself was based on the Korean movie The Quiet Family. It stars Komal Kumar, Iswarya Menon, Anaswara Kumar, Gayathri Iyer, and Harish Raj in the lead roles. Telugu comedian Ali made his second Kannada movie with this film.
It's also dubbed in Hindi with the same name.

Cast
 Komal Kumar as Karthik
 Iswarya Menon as Soumya
 Anaswara Kumar as Mohini
 Gayathri Iyer
 Harish Raj as Sharath alias Bhaskar
 Avinash as Karadi Shivanna
 Vinayak Joshi
 Ali as Brother Ali
 Shobharaj as Police Inspector 
 Nalinikanth
 Aadhav Kannadasan
 Nikita Thukral as herself in cameo appearance
Nurse jayalakshmi in  guest role

Soundtrack
The music was composed by Farhaan Roshan, S. N. Prasad  and released by Sony Music India.
Daler Mehndi sang a song in the film. SN Prasad retained his tunes from the original Tamil film.

References

2014 films
Indian comedy horror films
2014 comedy horror films
2014 horror films
Kannada remakes of Tamil films
2010s Kannada-language films
Indian horror film remakes
Indian remakes of South Korean films
2014 comedy films